This is a list of events from British radio in 1956.

Events
22 December – The BBC Light Programme begins transmitting from the Wenvoe transmitting station in south Wales on VHF, giving it a wider audience.

Programme debuts
24 April – The Clitheroe Kid is piloted on the BBC North Home Service
June – My Word! is piloted on the BBC Midland Home Service, chaired by John Arlott
17 August – Floggit's featuring Elsie and Doris Waters opens on the BBC Light Programme (1956–1959), including Ronnie Barker's radio debut

Continuing radio programmes

1930s
 In Town Tonight (1933–1960)

1940s
 Music While You Work (1940–1967)
 Sunday Half Hour (1940–2018)
 Desert Island Discs (1942–Present)
 Family Favourites (1945–1980)
 Down Your Way (1946–1992)
 Have A Go (1946–1967)
 Housewives' Choice (1946–1967)
 Letter from America (1946–2004)
 Woman's Hour (1946–Present)
 Twenty Questions (1947–1976)
 Any Questions? (1948–Present)
 Mrs Dale's Diary (1948–1969)
 Take It from Here (1948–1960)
 Billy Cotton Band Show (1949–1968)
 A Book at Bedtime (1949–Present)
 Ray's a Laugh (1949–1961)

1950s
 The Archers (1950–Present)
 Educating Archie (1950–1960)
 Listen with Mother (1950–1982)
 The Goon Show (1951–1960)
 Hancock's Half Hour (1954–1959)
 From Our Own Correspondent (1955–Present)
 Pick of the Pops (1955–Present)

Births
 6 January – Angus Deayton, actor and television presenter
 9 January – Imelda Staunton, actress
 21 January – Ian McMillan, poet and broadcaster
 14 February – Tom Watt, radio presenter, journalist and actor
 1 March – Helen Boaden, broadcasting executive
 4 May – Charlotte Green, radio newsreader and announcer
 2 June – Susan Rae, Scottish radio newsreader and announcer
 6 June – Vaughan Savidge, radio newsreader and announcer
 7 July – Jonathan Kydd, actor
 2 October – John Pienaar, political journalist
 30 October – Juliet Stevenson, actress
 8 November – Richard Curtis, scriptwriter
 27 November – John McCarthy, journalist
 26 December – Simon Fanshawe, writer and broadcaster
 29 December – Fred MacAulay, Scottish comedian

Deaths
 20 May – Sir Max Beerbohm, theatre critic, humorist and broadcaster (born 1872)

See also 
 1956 in British music
 1956 in British television
 1956 in the United Kingdom
 List of British films of 1956

References 

 
Years in British radio
Radio